Minami Katsu (born 1 July 1998) is a Japanese professional golfer. She is the youngest winner in the history of the LPGA of Japan Tour when she won the KKT Cup Vantelin Ladies Open as an amateur on 20 April 2014 at age 15.

Early life
Katsu was born in Kagoshima City in 1998. She began to play golf at the age of six under her grandfather's influence.

Amateur wins
2014 New Zealand Women's Stroke Play Championship, Japan Junior Golf Championship (girl's aged 15–17 division)
2015 Japan Women's Amateur

Professional career
Katsu has eight wins on the LPGA of Japan Tour, including one as an amateur.

Katsu earned her LPGA Tour card for the 2023 season via Q-School.

Professional wins (8)

LPGA of Japan Tour wins (8)

Katsu won the 2014 KKT Cup Vantelin Ladies Open as an amateur.
Tournaments in bold denotes major tournaments in LPGA of Japan Tour.

Team appearances
Amateur
Espirito Santo Trophy (representing Japan): 2014

References

External links

Japanese female golfers
LPGA of Japan Tour golfers
LPGA Tour golfers
Golfers at the 2014 Asian Games
Asian Games competitors for Japan
People from Kagoshima
1998 births
Living people
20th-century Japanese women
21st-century Japanese women